A172, A-172 may refer to:
 A172 road (England), a road connecting Ingleby Arncliffe and Middlesbrough
 A172 road (Malaysia), a road in Perak connecting Pengkalan Hulu and Kampung Baru Tasek
 A-172 (cell line), a human glioblastoma cell line